Kanison Phoopun (Thai: คณิศร ภู่พันธ์), is a Thai futsal goalkeeper, and a member of  Thailand national futsal team. He plays  for Port Futsal Club in Futsal Thailand League.

References

Kanison Phoopun
Living people
1991 births
Futsal goalkeepers
Kanison Phoopun
Southeast Asian Games medalists in futsal
Competitors at the 2017 Southeast Asian Games
Kanison Phoopun